Ernest Money Wigram (20 November 1862 – 10 June 1906) was an English first-class cricketer.

Born at Kensington, Wigram made a single appearance in first-class cricket for Orleans Club against Oxford University at Twickenham in 1883. He bowled seventeen wicketless overs in the match, while with the bat he scored 6 run in the Orleans Club first-innings, before being dismissed by Alexander Stewart, while in their second-innings he remained unbeaten on 3, with Oxford University winning by 290 runs. He died at Eastry in Kent in June 1906.

References

External links

1862 births
1906 deaths
Sportspeople from Kensington
English cricketers
Orleans Club cricketers